Sweet's Corner is a community in the Canadian province of Nova Scotia, located in the Municipal District of West Hants.

References
 Sweet's Corner on Destination Nova Scotia

Communities in Hants County, Nova Scotia
General Service Areas in Nova Scotia